Simion Movilă (after 1559  14 September 1607), a boyar of the Movileşti family, was twice Prince of Wallachia (November 1600 – June 1601; October 1601 – July 1602) and Prince of Moldavia from July 1606 until his death.

Family
He was the grandson of Petru Rareș, younger brother of Ieremia Movilă, and father of Peter Mogila, who became the Metropolitan of Kiev, Halych and All-Rus' from 1633 until his death, and later was canonized as a saint in the Russian, Romanian and Polish Orthodox Churches.

Biography

In the early 1580s, Simion, along with his brothers, built Sucevița Monastery.

In October 1600, he was put on the throne of Wallachia by Polish forces.

In August 1602, Simion was defeated by Radu Șerban and forced into exile to Moldavia.

After the death of his brother Ieremia in July 1606, Simion gained the Moldavian throne. By making rich gifts, Simion managed to be recognized by the sultan. While he was ruler of Moldavia, he had hostile relations with the Poles.

Death 

He died on September 14, 1607 after a reign of only a year and a few months. His death was suspected to be the result of poisoning, which only further inflamed tensions around succession. This eventually spiralled into war, which was eventually won by his son Mihail after Polish support. 

Simion was buried at the Sucevita Monastery.

Footnotes

References

Bibliography 

 
 
 
 
 
 

Rulers of Moldavia
Rulers of Wallachia
1607 deaths
Rulers of Moldavia and Wallachia
Year of birth unknown
People of the Long Turkish War